HMS Churchill was the first of three  nuclear fleet submarines that served with the Royal Navy.

Construction
Churchill, the Royal Navy's fourth nuclear-powered fleet submarine was ordered on 21 October 1965, and was laid down at Vickers Shipbuilding and Engineering Limited (VSEL)'s Barrow-in-Furness shipyard on 30 June 1967. The submarine was launched by Mary Soames, Winston Churchill's youngest daughter, on 20 December 1968 and commissioned on 15 July 1970.

Propulsion
Churchill was chosen to trial the first full-size submarine pump jet propulsion.  Trials of a high-speed unit were followed by further trials with a low-speed unit, and these were successful enough for the same propulsion to be fitted in the rest of the class.   Later British submarine classes also featured the pump jet, although first-of-class vessels Swiftsure and Trafalgar were fitted with propellers at build.

References

External links
 http://www.hmschurchill.co.uk 
 Film of Churchills launch- Imperial War Museum

 

Churchill-class submarines
1968 ships